Marguerite Harl (3 April 1919 – 30 August 2020) was a French scholar, who worked on the Septuagint, Philo of Alexandria and early patristic writers such as Clement of Alexandria and Origen. She was born in Paris in April 1919 and became a pupil of Henri-Irénée Marrou. She was a professor of Ancient Greek at the Sorbonne University from 1958 to 1983.

Harl died in August 2020 at the age of 101.

Bibliography
 La Bible grecque des Septante, Cerf, 1988
 La Langue de Japhet, Cerf, 1992
 Le Déchiffrement du sens, Institut d'études augustiniennes
 La Bible en Sorbonne, ou la revanche d'Érasme, Cerf, 2004, Recension in Esprit et Vie
 L'Europe et les Pères, Nouvelle Cité
 Origène d'Alexandrie et la fonction révélatrice du Verbe incarné
 Marguerite Harl, Gilles Dorival et Olivier Munnich, La Bible grecque des Septante. Du judaïsme hellénistique au christianisme ancien, éditions du Cerf & CNRS Éditions, 1994

See also 
 Catena (biblical commentary)
 Hellenistic Judaism
 Claude Mondésert
 Joseph Mélèze-Modrzejewski
 Bible translations into French
 La Bible d'Alexandrie

References

External links 
 Marguerite Harl on data.bnf.fr

1919 births
2020 deaths
French biblical scholars
French centenarians
French hellenists
French scholars
French translators
Greek–French translators
Women centenarians
Academic staff of the University of Paris